Sasu Numbari Jawai Dus Numbari is a Marathi movie released on 7 March 2008. It was produced by Harsh Patil and directed by Vijay Patkar.

Cast 
The cast includes

 Nirmiti Sawant
 Makarand Anaspure 
 Pradnya Jadhav 
 Vikas Samudre 
 Jayraj Nayar
 Vijay Kadam 
 Deepali Sayyad

Soundtrack
The music is provided by Bal Naik.

Awards and Accolades

The film ran to packed houses all over Maharashtra.

References

External links 
 
  Movie Reviews - rottentomatoes.com
 Movie Info - mubi.com

2008 films
2000s Marathi-language films